Rafael La Porta (born c. 1962) is the Robert J. and Nancy D. Carney University Professor of Economics at Brown University. La Porta received his A.B. in economics at Pontifical Catholic University of Argentina in Argentina and his A.M. and Ph.D. in economics at Harvard University in Cambridge, MA. La Porta served as a professor of economics at Harvard and the Tuck School of Business at Dartmouth College before accepting a position at Brown. His research is primarily in corporate governance and investor protections across the world. He is the coauthor of the influential article "Law and Finance," which appeared in the Journal of Political Economy in December 1998.

Bibliography

References

External links
http://faculty.tuck.dartmouth.edu/rafael-laporta/
https://news.brown.edu/articles/2017/05/corporation

Living people
1960s births
21st-century American economists
Tuck School of Business faculty
Harvard University alumni
Brown University faculty
Pontifical Catholic University of Argentina alumni